Simon Lewty (1941-2021) was an English artist.
Lewty used many different layers in his work and mixed text with picture.  Some of his work was based on a map of Warwickshire - where he used to live - and he drew pictures symbolizing his memories of the place.

Early life
He was born in Sutton Coldfield in 1941.  He attended Mid-Warwickshire School of Art, now Warwickshire College (1957–1960), Hornsey College of Art (1961–1963). He worked as a lecturer at the Mid-Warwickshire College of Further Education, (Warwickshire College), (1964–1981), before living and working in Leamington Spa, Warwickshire and in Swanage, Dorset.

Monograph
The Self as a Stranger (2010) is a monograph on the work of Simon Lewty, Black Dog Publishing, London.

References
 

1941 births
2021 deaths
English artists
People from Sutton Coldfield